Tiago André Coelho Lopes (born 25 July 1989), known as Rabiola, is a Portuguese professional footballer who plays for AC Vila Meã as a forward.

Club career
Rabiola was born in Guimarães. A product of Vitória de Guimarães' youth system, he made his professional debut in the 2006–07 season. He helped the club return to the Primeira Liga with five games and one goal, which came in a 6–0 home rout of Portimonense S.C. on 6 May 2007.

Subsequently bought by FC Porto on a three-year contract, with an option for another two, Rabiola spent the first half of the 2007–08 campaign on loan to Vitória. Again he rarely appeared, playing four matches for the eventual third-placed team, and a goal as a late substitute against U.D. Leiria. He returned to Porto in January 2008, but waited 15 months to make his first league appearance for them, playing one minute in a 2–0 home win over Vitória de Setúbal after having replaced Lisandro López.

Rabiola was loaned again for 2009–10, now to S.C. Olhanense which had just returned to the top division. He alternated between the first and the second tiers in the following years, representing C.D. Aves (two spells), C.D. Feirense (where he seriously injured his knee) and S.C. Braga (originally signed to a four-and-a-half-year deal, he only appeared for the reserves during his spell).

On 8 June 2015, after suffering relegation from the Primeira Liga with F.C. Penafiel, Rabiola moved to Académica de Coimbra on a two-year contract. He scored only twice during his only season as his team met the same fate. The following summer, he joined F.C. Paços de Ferreira in the same league, but missed the entire campaign due to an anterior cruciate ligament injury and subsequently was not re-signed.

Having not played a match for over two years, Rabiola dropped into the third tier for the first time in July 2018, signing for F.C. Felgueiras 1932. He scored 15 goals in 25 games in his first season, including a hat-trick the following 17 March in the first half-hour of a 5–1 home defeat of A.D. Limianos.

On 20 January 2020, as leading goalscorer in Felgueiras' group, Rabiola transferred to F.C. Vizela, leaders of another group. On 8 June, he joined AD Fafe for the upcoming season.

International career
Rabiola won 26 caps for Portugal in three youth age groups, and scored six goals. He made his debut for the under-21s on 4 June 2009, playing 33 minutes after replacing Braga's Yazalde in a 1–0 loss against Chile in that year's Toulon Tournament.

Club statistics

Honours
Porto
Primeira Liga: 2008–09
Taça de Portugal: 2008–09

References

External links

National team data 

1989 births
Living people
Sportspeople from Guimarães
Portuguese footballers
Association football forwards
Primeira Liga players
Liga Portugal 2 players
Campeonato de Portugal (league) players
Vitória S.C. players
FC Porto players
S.C. Olhanense players
C.D. Aves players
C.D. Feirense players
S.C. Braga players
S.C. Braga B players
F.C. Penafiel players
Associação Académica de Coimbra – O.A.F. players
F.C. Paços de Ferreira players
F.C. Felgueiras 1932 players
F.C. Vizela players
AD Fafe players
AC Vila Meã players
Ekstraklasa players
Piast Gliwice players
Portugal youth international footballers
Portugal under-21 international footballers
Portuguese expatriate footballers
Expatriate footballers in Poland
Portuguese expatriate sportspeople in Poland